Ahmad ibn Umar ibn Shu'ayb was the seventh Emir of Crete, reigning from .

The surviving records on the internal history and rulers of the Emirate of Crete are very fragmentary. He is tentatively identified as a son of the third emir, Abu Abdallah Umar, and as the great-grandson of the conqueror of Crete and founder of the emirate, Abu Hafs Umar.

During his reign, in the 930s, the Cretans heavily raided the Byzantine territories around the Aegean Sea: attacks are recorded in the Peloponnese, Central Greece, Mount Athos, and the western coast of Asia Minor. This new wave of raids led to the decision of the Byzantine emperor Constantine VII to launch another expedition to recapture Crete. This expedition did not sail until 949, and was a failure.

He was succeeded by his son, Shu'ayb.

References

Sources
 
 

10th-century Arabs
10th-century rulers in Europe
Emirs of Crete
Arab people of the Arab–Byzantine wars
People from Crete